The 4th Arabian Gulf Cup was the fourth edition of the Arabian Gulf Cup. The tournament was held in Doha, Qatar and was won by three-time defending champions Kuwait. The tournament took place between 26 March and 15 April 1976. All matches were played at the Khalifa Sports City Stadium.

Iraq took part in the competition for the first time. Both Iraq and Kuwait finished level on points and goal difference in the round-robin group stage; thus, a play-off final was held to determine the champion. Kuwait defeated Iraq 4–2 in the final to win their fourth title in a row. 

The number of teams was increased from six to seven and the format of the competition was changed back to the original format used in 1970 and 1972.

Teams

Venues

Match officials

Tournament
The seven teams in the tournament played a single round-robin style competition. The team achieving first place in the overall standings was the tournament winner.

All times are local, AST (UTC+3).

Matches

Championship play-off
Since both Kuwait and Iraq finished level on points and goal difference, a play-off final was held between the two sides to determine the champion.

Winners

Statistics

Goalscorers

Awards
Player of the Tournament
 Ali Kadhim

Top Scorer
 Jasem Yaqoub (9 goals)

Goalkeeper of the Tournament
 Hamood Sultan

References

1976
1976
1976 in Asian football
1975–76 in Saudi Arabian football
1975–76 in Iraqi football
1975–76 in Emirati football
1975–76 in Kuwaiti football
1975–76 in Qatari football
1975–76 in Bahraini football
1976 in Oman